Lillicrap is a surname. Notable people with the surname include:

Cameron Lillicrap (born 1963), Australian international rugby union player
Charles Lillicrap (1887–1966), British naval architect
Christopher Lillicrap (born 1949), British television presenter, writer and composer
James Lillicrap (d. 1851), British Royal Navy officer
John Lillicrap (1866–1937), New Zealand politician
Siwan Lillicrap (born 1987), Welsh international rugby union player
Timothy Lillicrap, Canadian neuroscientist and AI researcher